The Golden Globe Award for Best Director – Motion Picture is a Golden Globe Award that has been presented annually by the Hollywood Foreign Press Association, an organization composed of journalists who cover the United States film industry for publications based outside North America, since 1943.

Having won all four of his nominations, Elia Kazan has been honored most often in this category. Clint Eastwood, Miloš Forman, David Lean, Martin Scorsese, Steven Spielberg, and Oliver Stone tie for second place with three wins each. Steven Spielberg has had the most nominations (fourteen). Barbra Streisand, Chloé Zhao and Jane Campion are the only women to have won the award.

In the following lists, the first names, listed in bold type against a blue background, are the winners, and the following names are the remaining nominees. The years given are those in which the films under consideration were released, not the year of the ceremony, which takes place in January of the following year.

Winners and nominees

1940s

1950s

1960s

1970s

1980s

1990s

2000s

2010s

2020s

Multiple nominations

More than 5 nominations 
 Steven Spielberg (14/3)
 Martin Scorsese (9/3)
 Clint Eastwood (7/3)
 Fred Zinnemann (7/2)
 Francis Ford Coppola (6/2)
 Sidney Lumet (6/1)

5 nominations

 Woody Allen (5/0)
 John Huston (5/2)
 Stanley Kramer (5/1)
 Mike Nichols (5/1)
 Billy Wilder (5/2)
 Robert Wise (5/0)

4 nominations

 Robert Altman (4/1)
 David Fincher (4/1)
 Miloš Forman (4/3)
 Peter Jackson (4/1)
 Elia Kazan (4/4)
 Stanley Kubrick (4/0)
 David Lean (4/3)
 Ang Lee (4/2)
 Alexander Payne (4/0)
 Robert Redford (4/1)
 Rob Reiner (4/0)
 Ridley Scott (4/0)
 Oliver Stone (4/3)
 Quentin Tarantino (4/0)
 Peter Weir (4/0)
 William Wyler (4/1)

3 nominations

 Hal Ashby (3/0)
 Richard Attenborough (3/1)
 Bernardo Bertolucci (3/1)
 James L. Brooks (3/0)
 James Cameron (3/2)
 George Cukor (3/1)
 Ron Howard (3/0)
 Alejandro González Iñárritu (3/1)
 James Ivory (3/0)
 Norman Jewison (3/0)
 Sam Mendes (3/2)
 Anthony Minghella (3/0)
 Vincente Minnelli (3/1)
 Alan Parker (3/0)
 Sydney Pollack (3/0)
 John Schlesinger (3/0)
 George Stevens (3/0)

2 nominations

 Kathryn Bigelow (2/0)
 Peter Bogdanovich (2/0)
 John Boorman (2/0)
 Richard Brooks (2/0)
 Jane Campion (2/1)
 George Clooney (2/0)
 Joel Coen (2/0)
 Alfonso Cuarón (2/2)
 Stephen Daldry (2/0)
 Bob Fosse (2/0)
 William Friedkin (2/2)
 John Frankenheimer (2/0)
 Mel Gibson (2/1)
 Roland Joffé (2/0)
 Spike Lee (2/0)
 Barry Levinson (2/0)
 Joshua Logan (2/1)
 George Lucas (2/0)
 Baz Luhrmann (2/0)
 David Lynch (2/0)
 Joseph L. Mankiewicz (2/0)
 Martin McDonagh (2/0)
 Robert Mulligan (2/0)
 Christopher Nolan (2/0)
 Roman Polanski (2/1)
 Otto Preminger (2/0)
 Martin Ritt (2/0)
 David O. Russell (2/0)
 Mark Rydell (2/0)
 Steven Soderbergh (2/0)
 Barbra Streisand (2/1)
 Peter Yates (2/0)
 Edward Zwick (2/0)

Multiple winners
4 awards
 Elia Kazan

3 awards

 Clint Eastwood
 Miloš Forman
 David Lean
 Martin Scorsese
 Steven Spielberg
 Oliver Stone

2 awards

 James Cameron
 Francis Ford Coppola
 Alfonso Cuarón
 William Friedkin
 John Huston
 Ang Lee
 Sam Mendes
 Billy Wilder
 Fred Zinnemann

See also
 BAFTA Award for Best Direction
 Academy Award for Best Director
 Critics' Choice Movie Award for Best Director
 Directors Guild of America Award for Outstanding Directing – Feature Film
 Independent Spirit Award for Best Director

References

General

 
 

Director
Lists of films by award
Awards for best director